Jamal Bajandouh (born 22 August 1992) is a Saudi Arabian professional footballer who plays as a defensive midfielder for Al-Tai. Born in England, he plays for the Saudi Arabia national team.

Career
Bajandouh was born in Bournemouth but joined Saudi Arabian side Al-Ittihad as a 13-year-old. He signed for English non-league side Wimborne Town in February 2012. Three months later, he signed for AFC Bournemouth after a spell training with their youth side.

In the summer of 2013, Bajandouh returned to Saudi Arabia to rejoin Al-Ittihad. In the summer of 2019, Bajandouh announced, via the player's official twitter account, his departure from Al-Ittihad.
On 13 July 2019, Bajandouh joined Croatian side NK Varaždin on a two-year deal.

On 22 September 2020, Bajandouh joined Al-Shabab on a free transfer. On 8 January 2022, Bajandouh joined Al-Tai on a six-month loan. On 27 July 2022, Bajandouh joined Al-Tai on a two-year deal.

International career
On 30 March 2015, Bajandouh made his senior debut for Saudi Arabia, playing the first half in a 2-1 victory over Jordan. Since it was a friendly fixture, he remains available to play for England.

References

External links
 
 

1992 births
Living people
Footballers from Bournemouth
Saudi Arabian footballers
Saudi Arabia international footballers
English footballers
Saudi Arabian people of Yemeni descent
English people of Saudi Arabian descent
English people of Yemeni descent
Saudi Arabian Sunni Muslims
Association football utility players
Association football midfielders
Association football defenders
Ittihad FC players
NK Varaždin players
Al-Shabab FC (Riyadh) players
Al-Tai FC players
Saudi Arabian expatriate footballers
Hadhrami people
British Sunni Muslims
Saudi Professional League players
Croatian Football League players
Expatriate footballers in Croatia
Saudi Arabian expatriate sportspeople in Croatia